The Genuine Imitation Life Gazette is a 1969 album by American rock band the Four Seasons. Member Bob Gaudio teamed up with Jake Holmes to create a psychedelic concept album which adjusted the band's stylings to the changing times of the late 1960s. Instead of love songs, the band tackled subjects such as war and racial tension.

The album's packaging was also distinctive, with the cover being stylized as a newspaper and the sleeve containing an eight-page newspaper-like insert that also had specially-done color underground comics strips by Skip Williamson and Jay Lynch.

The first single issued seven months before the album's release (June 1968) was "Saturday's Father" (Philips 40542). It only bubbled under at number 103 on the Billboard Hot 100. A second single with both sides culled from the album, "Idaho" and "Something's on Her Mind," was released in March 1969 as Philips 40597. Both sides barely crept into the Billboard Hot 100, at number 95 and number 98, respectively.

Critical reception

In a review for AllMusic, Donald A. Guarisco says the album "lives up to its reputation as the most bizarre album in the Four Seasons' catalog", describing it as "a concept album that casts a satirical eye on American life." He calls it "relentlessly inventive, skillfully constructed, and never dull" and "a stunning example of the artistry of the Four Seasons at their most ambitious."

The Dangerous Minds web site reports that at a 1970s dinner party Gaudio was told by John Lennon that Genuine Imitation Life Gazette was one of his favorite albums. The same site says that after Frank Sinatra heard the album he hired Gaudio and Holmes to create his album Watertown.

Track listing
All tracks written by Bob Gaudio and Jake Holmes, except as noted.
"American Crucifixion Resurrection" — 6:50
"Mrs. Stately's Garden" — 3:15
"Look Up Look Over" — 4:42
"Something's on Her Mind" — 2:49
"Saturday's Father" — 3:14
"Wall Street Village Day" — 4:27
"Genuine Imitation Life" (Jake Holmes) — 6:16  
"Idaho" — 3:02
"Wonder What You'll Be" — 3:31
"Soul of a Woman" — 7:14

Personnel 
Partial credits from AllMusic.

The Four Seasons
Frankie Valli - vocals
Tommy DeVito - lead guitar; vocals
Bob Gaudio - vocals, keyboards, piano, arrangements
Joe Long - vocals, bass, assistant music editor

Additional musicians
 Charles Calello – arrangements, conductor
John Holmes – percussion, hi-hat
Joseph Cassiere (aka Joey Cass) – drums
Vincent Corrao – guitar
Anthony De Angelis – woodwind
Richard Natoli – woodwind
Salvatore Piccolo – trumpet
 Emmanuel Green – concertmaster

Production staff
 Bob Crewe – producer
 Roy Cicala – engineer
 Shelly Yakus – assistant engineer
 Frank Scrsggi – coordinating producer
 Bob Ludwig – mastering
 Don Snyder – design, photography
 Desmond Strobel – graphics

References

1969 albums
The Four Seasons (band) albums
Albums produced by Bob Crewe
Concept albums